Events from the year 1970 in Canada.

Incumbents

Crown 
 Monarch – Elizabeth II

Federal government 
 Governor General – Roland Michener
 Prime Minister – Pierre Trudeau
 Chief Justice – John Robert Cartwright (Ontario) (until 23 March) then Gérald Fauteux (Quebec)
 Parliament – 28th

Provincial governments

Lieutenant governors 
Lieutenant Governor of Alberta – Grant MacEwan
Lieutenant Governor of British Columbia – John Robert Nicholson 
Lieutenant Governor of Manitoba – Richard Spink Bowles (until September 2) then William John McKeag 
Lieutenant Governor of New Brunswick – Wallace Samuel Bird 
Lieutenant Governor of Newfoundland – Ewart John Arlington Harnum 
Lieutenant Governor of Nova Scotia – Victor de Bedia Oland
Lieutenant Governor of Ontario – William Ross Macdonald
Lieutenant Governor of Prince Edward Island – John George MacKay 
Lieutenant Governor of Quebec – Hugues Lapointe 
Lieutenant Governor of Saskatchewan – Robert Hanbidge (until February 2) then Stephen Worobetz

Premiers 
Premier of Alberta – Harry Strom
Premier of British Columbia – W.A.C. Bennett 
Premier of Manitoba – Edward Schreyer
Premier of New Brunswick – Louis Robichaud (until November 12) then Richard Hatfield
Premier of Newfoundland – Joey Smallwood 
Premier of Nova Scotia – G.I. Smith (until October 28) then Gerald Regan
Premier of Ontario – John Robarts 
Premier of Prince Edward Island – Alexander B. Campbell 
Premier of Quebec – Jean-Jacques Bertrand (until May 12) then Robert Bourassa 
Premier of Saskatchewan – Ross Thatcher

Territorial governments

Commissioners 
 Commissioner of Yukon – James Smith 
 Commissioner of Northwest Territories – Stuart Milton Hodgson

Events

January to June
January 1 - The cities Fort William and Port Arthur are merged to create Thunder Bay, Ontario
January 16 - The federal government announces plans to convert the nation to the metric system
February 2 - Canada becomes an official observer at the Organization of American States
February 5 - An oil tanker runs aground in Chedabucto Bay, Nova Scotia causing a major oil spill
February 17 - The use of phosphates in laundry detergent is banned
March 2 - Keith Spicer is appointed as the first Official Languages Commissioner
March 7 - A total solar eclipse affects the Maritimes
March 20 - The Francophonie is established with Canada as a founding member
May 1 - The Capitol Cinema, Ottawa's only movie palace, is closed and later demolished
May 12 - Robert Bourassa becomes Premier of Quebec after his Liberals defeat the Union Nationale party
May 22 - The Canadian Radio-television and Telecommunications Commission issues the first Canadian content rules for television and radio
May 29 - The Hudson's Bay Company moves its headquarters from London to Winnipeg, Manitoba
June 26 - The federal voting age is lowered from 21 to 18

July to December
July 5 - 109 people are killed in the crash of an Air Canada DC-8.
August 2 - Three Canadians are killed when a ferry collides with a Soviet freighter off British Columbia
August 17 - Arthur Erickson is awarded at Expo '70 for his design of the Canadian pavilion
August 20 - The Sudbury, Ontario tornado event, with winds up to 100 miles per hour, hits Sudbury and Field, Ontario. It was one of the worst tornadoes in Canadian history — killing six people, injuring 200, and causing C$17 million dollars in property damage.
September 27 - TVOntario begins broadcasting
October - Canada establishes formal relations with the People's Republic of China.
October 5 - October Crisis: British Trade Commissioner James Cross is kidnapped by the FLQ.
October 5 - Award-winning news & current affairs program, 24Hours starts on CBWT in Winnipeg.
October 10 - October Crisis: Quebec Minister of Labour Pierre Laporte is kidnapped by FLQ.
October 13 - Canada and the People's Republic of China establish diplomatic relations.
October 16 - October Crisis: Pierre Trudeau introduces the War Measures Act to deal with the FLQ threat. Trudeau also addresses the nation in a televised speech explaining why he invoked the War Measures Act.
October 17 - October Crisis: The body of Pierre Laporte is found in the trunk of a car.
October 28 - Gerald Regan becomes Premier of Nova Scotia after his Liberals defeat George Smith's Conservatives in the 1970 election.
November 6 - Police raid the hiding place of the FLQ's Chenier cell, arresting Bernard Lortie for the kidnapping and murder of Pierre Laporte.
November 12 - Richard Hatfield becomes Premier of New Brunswick after his Conservatives defeat Louis Robichaud's Liberals in the 1970 election.
December 3 - October Crisis: James Cross is released unharmed by FLQ
December 28 - October Crisis: The FLQ kidnappers of Pierre Laporte are caught.

Full date unknown
The Royal Commission on the Status of Women reports to Parliament
INCO builds the world's tallest smokestack at Copper Cliff, Ontario
The Pierre Laporte Bridge opens in Quebec City, at the time it is Canada's longest bridge
The Don't Make a Wave Committee, the predecessor organization to Greenpeace, is founded in Vancouver
The first ACTRA Awards are held
Louis Cyr Monument

Arts and literature

New books
The Collected Works of Billy the Kid - Michael Ondaatje
S th story I to: trew adventure - bill bissett
Fifth Business - Robertson Davies
The Journals of Susanna Moodie - Margaret Atwood
Il est par là, le soleil - Roch Carrier
The National Dream - Pierre Berton
La Rivière sans repos - Gabrielle Roy
Counterblast - Marshall McLuhan

New plays
The Ecstasy of Rita Joe - George Ryga

Awards
See 1970 Governor General's Awards for a complete list of winners and finalists for those awards.
Stephen Leacock Award: Farley Mowat, The Boat Who Wouldn't Float
Vicky Metcalf Award: Farley Mowat

Film
Paul Almond's Act of the Heart opens

Music
June 23 - The first Juno Awards for Canadian music are held.

Sport

February 16 - Police recover the Grey Cup after it was stolen the previous December.
March 7 - Toronto Varsity Blues won their Fourth University Cup by defeating the Saint Mary's Huskies 3 to 2. The Final game was played in Charlottetown, Prince Edward Island
April 5 - Bobby Orr becomes the first National Hockey League (NHL) defenceman to win the scoring title.
May 2 - Montreal is awarded the 1976 Summer Olympics.
May 10 - Parry Sound, Ontario's Bobby Orr is awarded the Conn Smythe Trophy
May 12 - Ontario Hockey Association's Montreal Jr. Canadiens won their fourth and final Memorial Cup by defeating the Saskatchewan Junior Hockey League'sWeyburn Red Wings 4 games to 0. All games were played at the Montreal Forum
May 22 - The National Hockey League adds a third Canadian team as the Vancouver Canucks are established.
November 21 - Manitoba Bisons won their second consecutive Vanier Cup by defeating the Ottawa Gee-Gees 38–11 in the 6th Vanier Cup played at Varsity Stadium in Toronto
November 28 - Montreal Alouettes won their Second Grey Cup by defeating the Calgary Stampeders 23–10 in the 58th Grey Cup played at Exhibition Stadium at Toronto. 
The first Arctic Winter Games commence in Yellowknife.

Births

January to March
January 6 - David Saint-Jacques, astronaut 
January 19 - Donald Haddow, swimmer
January 24 - Lynn Coady, novelist and journalist
February 18 - Raine Maida, singer and songwriter
February 22 – Nicole Oliver, actress, voice actress, and singer
February 23 - Marie-Josée Croze, actress
March 18 - Ian Bird, field hockey player
March 20 - Andrew Kishino, actor, voice actor, and rapper

April to June

April 8 - J. R. Bourne, actor
April 11 - Trevor Linden, ice hockey player
May 3 - Marie-Soleil Tougas, Quebec actress and TV host (d. 1997)
May 4 
 Will Arnett, actor
 Karla Homolka, convicted murderer
May 6 - Kavan Smith, actor
May 8 - Naomi Klein, author and activist
May 11 - Heather Stefanson, politician
May 12 - Mike Weir, golfer
May 19 
 Mario Dumont, politician
 Jason Gray-Stanford, actor
May 20 - Jason York, ice hockey player
June 2 - Patricia Noall, swimmer and Olympic bronze medalist
June 3 - Julie Masse, pop singer
June 4 - Donald Farley, cross-country skier (d. 2016)
June 12 - Gordon Michael Woolvett, actor
June 23 - Kerri Buchberger, volleyball player

July to September
July 14 - Michelle Sawatzky, volleyball player
July 17 - Gavin McInnes, far right commentator
July 28 - Isabelle Brasseur, pair skater
July 31 - Amanda Stepto, actress
August 6 - Michael Strange, boxer
August 9 - Rod Brind'Amour, ice hockey player
August 16 
 Tina Connelly, track and field athlete
 Dean Del Mastro, politician
 Daren Millard, sportscaster
August 19 - James Rajotte, politician
August 31 - Zack Ward, actor

September 1 - Mitsou, pop singer, businesswoman, television and radio host and actress
September 7 
 Keltie Duggan, swimmer
 Gino Odjick, ice hockey player (d. 2023)
September 19 - Kathryn Humphreys, CityNews sports anchor
September 24 - Isabelle Turcotte Baird, triathlete

October to December
October 5 - Tina Poitras, race walker
October 8 - Heather Jones, field hockey player
November 9 - Chris Jericho, wrestler, actor, author, radio and television host and rock musician
November 10 - Sue Reid, field hockey player
November 12 - Sarah Harmer, singer-songwriter and activist
November 15 - Jeff Adams, wheelchair athlete, multiple Paralympic medalist and World Champion
December 15 - Michael Shanks, actor
December 18 - Victoria Pratt, actress and model
December 19 - Jonathan Cleveland, swimmer and Olympic bronze medalist
December 20 - Nicole de Boer, actress
December 22 - Ted Cruz, politician, and U.S. Senator from Texas since 2013
December 23 - Catriona Le May Doan, speed skater, double Olympic gold medalist and World Champion
December 25 - Stu Barnes, ice hockey player and coach

Full date unknown
 Maher Arar, engineer and rendition victim

Deaths
January 23 - Nell Shipman, actress, screenwriter, producer, and animal trainer (b.1892)
January 29 - Lawren Harris, Group of Seven painter (b.1885)
February 21 - Louis-René Beaudoin, politician and Speaker of the House of Commons of Canada (b.1912)
February 27 - Marie Dionne, one of the Dionne quintuplets (b.1934)
March 11 - William Stewart Wallace, historian
March 23 - Del Lord, film director and actor (b.1894)
April 6 - Émile Coderre, French-Canadian poet
May 9 - Andrew Watson Myles, politician (b.1884)
May 31 - Terry Sawchuk, ice hockey player (b.1929)
June 12 - John Keiller MacKay, soldier, jurist and 19th Lieutenant Governor of Ontario (b.1888)
June 22 - William Melville Martin, politician and Premier of Saskatchewan (b.1876)
October 17 - Pierre Laporte, Quebec politician and Minister, kidnapped and murdered by Front de libération du Québec (FLQ) (b.1921)
September 12 - Jacob Viner, economist (b.1892)

See also
 1970 in Canadian television
 List of Canadian films of 1970

References 

 
Years of the 20th century in Canada
Canada
1970 in North America